A weighted network is a network where the ties among nodes have weights assigned to them. A network is a system whose elements are somehow connected. The elements of a system are represented as nodes (also known as actors or vertices) and the connections among interacting elements are known as ties, edges, arcs, or links. The nodes might be neurons, individuals, groups, organisations, airports, or even countries, whereas ties can take the form of friendship, communication, collaboration, alliance, flow, or trade, to name a few.

In a number of real-world networks, not all ties in a network have the same capacity. In fact, ties are often associated with weights that differentiate them in terms of their strength, intensity, or capacity On the one hand, Mark Granovetter (1973) argued that the strength of social relationships in social networks is a function of their duration, emotional intensity, intimacy, and exchange of services. On the other, for non-social networks, weights often refer to the function performed by ties, e.g., the carbon flow (mg/m2/day) between species in food webs, the number of synapses and gap junctions in neural networks, or the amount of traffic flowing along connections in transportation networks.

By recording the strength of ties, a weighted network can be created (also known as a valued network). 

Weighted networks are also widely used in genomic and systems biologic applications.  For example, weighted gene co-expression network analysis (WGCNA) is often used for constructing a weighted network among genes (or gene products) based on gene expression (e.g. microarray) data. More generally, weighted correlation networks can be defined by soft-thresholding the pairwise correlations among variables (e.g. gene measurements).

Measures for weighted networks
Although weighted networks are more difficult to analyse than if ties were simply present or absent, a number of network measures has been proposed for weighted networks:
 Node strength: The sum of weights attached to ties belonging to a node
 Closeness: Redefined by using Dijkstra's distance algorithm
 Betweenness: Redefined by using Dijkstra's distance algorithm
 The clustering coefficient (global): Redefined by using a triplet value
 The clustering coefficient (local): Redefined by using a triplet value or using an algebraic formula

A theoretical advantage of weighted networks is that they allow one to derive relationships among different network measures (also known as network concepts, statistics or indices). For example, Dong and Horvath (2007)  show that simple relationships among network measures can be derived in clusters of nodes (modules) in weighted networks. For weighted correlation networks, one can use the angular interpretation of correlations to provide a geometric interpretation of network theoretic concepts and to derive unexpected relationships among them Horvath and Dong (2008)

Software for analysing weighted networks
There are a number of software packages that can analyse weighted networks; see social network analysis software. Among these are the proprietary software UCINET and the open-source package tnet.

The WGCNA R package implements functions for constructing and analyzing weighted networks in particular weighted correlation networks.

See also
Disparity filter algorithm of weighted network

References

Network theory
Sociological terminology